Clostridium ljungdahlii is an anaerobic, rod-shaped, motile, endospore-forming, gram-positive bacterium. It is named after the biochemist Lars G. Ljungdahl. When originally harvested from the waste matter of animals, it tended to produce acetate with respect to ethanol, but a major undertaking to increase the ethanol-to-acetate ratio was initiated. A 1993 publication by researchers from the University of Arkansas, in cooperation with Oak Ridge National Laboratories, showed results from a series of continuous reactor studies caused a major change in the bacterium's preference for ethanol production, which increased from <0.1 g/L to 1.8 g/L in a continuous stirred tank reactor.

This species can ferment certain components of syngas into ethanol. It also possesses properties of electrosynthesis, producing acetate on cathodes.

Notes

References

External links
 Type strain of Clostridium ljungdahlii at BacDive -  the Bacterial Diversity Metadatabase

Gram-positive bacteria
Medically important anaerobes
Bacteria described in 1993
ljungdahlii